Troy High School is a public high school in Fullerton, California, U.S., acclaimed for its many programs including Troy Tech and International Baccalaureate. The school is part of the Fullerton Joint Union High School District. As of the 2019–20 school year, 2,604 students attend the school. Troy High School has the distinction of winning the most national titles (13 as of 2019) in the Science Olympiad. It is one of the seven high schools in California and one of 59 in the country to be awarded a New American High Schools status by the United States Department of Education. The school is located next to the continuing La Vista High School and California State University, Fullerton.

Academics

In the late 1980s and early 1990s, then-principal Jerry Atkin was instrumental in developing and implementing a Science and Technology magnet program, known as Troy Tech, for Troy High School. This program involves technology pathways with specialized courses as well as an internship students must complete the summer after junior year. Troy was one of 27 high schools nationwide honored as a New American High School by former U.S. President Bill Clinton in 2000. It has won first place in the U.S. National Science Olympiad in 1996, 1999, 2000, 2002, 2003, 2006, 2007, 2008, 2014, 2015, 2017, 2018 and 2019 and has also placed favorably in many other competitions on both the regional and national level, including the American Computer Science League (1st in the nation, 5th overall in 2005). Troy's Science Olympiad team has consistently attended nationals every year since 1994 except for 1995, and they have placed in the top 5 at nationals every year they have attended. Troy's Science Bowl Team has placed first and second for four years in the Western Regional Science Bowl sponsored by NASA/JPL and the U.S. Department of Energy. In 2001, the team captured the national second place at the U.S. Dept. of Energy Competition in Washington, D.C.

In 2008, the Western Association of Schools and Colleges granted the school a six-year accreditation.

Athletics

Baseball
The baseball team won the CIF 6-A High School Championship in June 1987. The game was played at Dodger Stadium. This was the school's first-ever CIF Championship.

Basketball
The Girls' Basketball Team won the state CIF Division II Title in 2003, 2005, and 2006. Sports Illustrated ranked the team the #4 program in the country for 2006, and the Los Angeles Times ranked Troy the #5 program in all of Southern California for the second year in a row.
In 2017 Kianna Smith was named as a McDonald's All American athlete. This is the first time anyone in the program has won the award.
In 2017 the women's basketball program won the freeway league title for the 25th time in a row.

Girls' Volleyball
The girls' volleyball team won the state title in 2012. They have continued to place in CIF semifinals since, and have won league every year since 2009.

Girls' Water Polo
The Girls' Water Polo team won the CIF Division IV Title in 2013. The Warriors became just the second Freeway League team to capture a CIF girls' water polo title. Coach Jason Wilson received State Coach of the Year following their win.

Girls' Swim and Dive
The Girls' Swim and Dive team won the CIF Division II Title in 2013.

Dodgeball
The school's dodgeball team, MouseCop, plays annually in the Fullerton Joint Union High School district tournament. The school's north gym is referred to as "MouseCop Arena @ THS" when hosting dodgeball events.

Journalism

Oracle
Troy's school newspaper is the Oracle, which was awarded the George H. Gallup Award in the Quill and Scroll International Honor Society News Media Evaluation Service in 2012  and 2014. A number of individual writers have also received honors in competitions such as Orange County Journalism Education Association (OCJEA).

Standardized testing statistics

SAT

Student body 
The following are details and statistics about Troy High School's student body:

Class
Troy High School has a total enrollment of 2,604 students.

Demographics

According to U.S. News & World Report, 86% of students enrolled at Troy High School come from minority backgrounds with 29% of the student body coming from an economically disadvantaged households, determined by student eligibility for California's Reduced-price meal program.

Males make up 51% of the student body and females make up 49% of the student body.

College attendance
As of 2019, 99% of Troy High School students attend colleges and universities. Of those, 75% attend 4 year universities and colleges and 24% 2 year colleges.

Controversy

Inappropriate relationship between wrestling coach and student
In December 2017, a Troy High School staff member spotted 20-year-old Garrett Granger, a walk-on wrestling coach, together with a 16-year-old female student. The staff member found their location to be out of the ordinary, so an investigation was launched shortly after. Fullerton School Resource Officers showed up on campus at approximately 9:00 AM. Authorities discovered that Granger and the female student had been in a sexual relationship in the weeks leading up to the incident. Granger was arrested and taken to the Fullerton City Jail under multiple sex crimes.

School shooting plans controversy 
In February 2017, two 16-year-old boys were arrested on suspicion of plotting a shooting. Parents attending a Troy High School girls' soccer game the day before overheard three students discussing school shootings and reported it to the School Resource Officer. The Fullerton Police Department investigated further and detained two of the three students. They reportedly "served warrants at multiple locations in Anaheim" and found no weapons, but did discover internet research on “school shooting topics, including weaponry” from as soon as the day of the soccer game. The two boys were released from the Orange County Juvenile Hall later that day.

The boys described their plan as being “bigger than Columbine,” referencing the 1999 Columbine High School massacre, the deadliest high school shooting in America's history. 
The case has now been closed and both boys were found innocent. However, both of them were expelled from the district and no longer attend the school.

Student election rigged
In April 2012, junior Jacob Bigham discovered that special education teacher Jenny Redmond had altered the results of the student body election. Bigham had overheard the default computer password during a visit with a vice principal. He was placed on a 5-day suspension after exposing the scandal.  Bigham expressed discontent with Troy's dismissal of Redmond's wrongdoing: "I feel changing the results of an election has far more gravity than finding out by whatever means that someone did that."
The school administration defended Redmond by not giving her any public discipline for tampering with the elections.  However, Redmond stepped down as the faculty advisor at the end of the year.  Jacob Bigham was instated  for the position he rightfully won on ASB the following year.  Despite Bigham's revealing the negative actions of Redmond and not having explicitly broken any school rule, his suspension was not removed.

Asbestos

In one incident, five asbestos-containing bags were left near an intake for the ventilation system feeding the entire school. Numerous individuals at the school later reported respiratory symptoms, and over 80 faculty members at the school signed a petition to the district demanding full disclosure of the extent of exposure. School and district officials still deny the existence of asbestos in the building, and refuse to disclose the full extent of the exposure.

Oracle controversy
In December 2004, Ann Long, at the time a Troy student and editor of the Oracle, the school newspaper, wrote an Oracle article that profiled several openly gay students at the school.  The school administration initiated disciplinary action against the student, citing school and state education codes that prohibit asking students about their sexual orientation without parental notification. Long claimed she was forced to resign voluntarily or she would be fired from her position as student editor, even though the article had been approved by the newspaper's faculty advisor. Long was supported by the American Civil Liberties Union, as well as the National Center for Lesbian Rights, the Gay-Straight Alliance Network and the California Safe Schools Coalition.

Racial slurs by school administrators
In March 2010, an employee at Troy High School came forward with audio tapes that had been taped over a period of 18 months. The tapes contained evidence of racial slurs made by Troy High School administrators against other faculty members. After district officials conducted an investigation of the allegations, vice principals Janine Van Poppellin and Joseph D'Amelia as well as  Geno Rose were temporarily placed on unpaid leave. At the Fullerton Joint Unified School District board meeting on March 15, 2010, board members deliberated and the board eventually approved the "release" of the administrators in question, effective June 30, 2010. Geno Rose filed a lawsuit in 2010, and a settlement has since been reached out of court.

Inappropriate relationship between teacher and student
In 2002, computer science teacher Craig Morgan Steele, 31, was charged in relation to an inappropriate sexual relationship with a former student.  The relationship was traced back to July and August 2001.

Drug Overdose 
In 2022, 17-year-old Trinity passed away due to an accidental fentanyl overdose. The cause of death is not confirmed yet but fentanyl overdose is the most speculated option.

Notable alumni
 Aaron Brewer, long snapper for the Arizona Cardinals 
 Marc Cherry, creator of ABC's Desperate Housewives
 Derrick Coleman, fullback who last played for the Arizona Cardinals
 Dennis Danell, former guitarist in Social Distortion
 Courtney Halverson, actress best known for Unfriended
 Tae Ha Kim (Taeha Types), internet personality and Twitch Streamer 
 Brent Liles, former bass player for Social Distortion and Agent Orange (band)
 Mike Ness, Founder and singer of the punk rock band, Social Distortion
 Alyson Noël, author, known for The Immortals (books)
 Tam O'Shaughnessy, former professional tennis player and co-founder of Sally Ride Science
 Eugene "Pobelter" Park, (Class of 2014) professional League of Legends player for Counter Logic Gaming
 Miguel A. Pulido, (Class of 1974) Mayor of Santa Ana, California from 1994 to 2020
 Steve Trachsel, former professional baseball player

References

External links
 
 GreatSchools.net profile

Educational institutions established in 1964
Education in Fullerton, California
International Baccalaureate schools in California
Magnet schools in California
High schools in Orange County, California
Public high schools in California
1964 establishments in California